Anette Hansson (born 2 May 1963) is a Swedish former football defender who won 39 caps for the Sweden women's national football team, scoring three goals.

International career
Hansson made her senior Sweden debut in the 1984 European Competition for Women's Football final first–leg against England at Ullevi on 12 May 1984. Sweden won the trophy in a penalty shootout at Kenilworth Road after a 1–1 aggregate draw.

Hansson's first international goal came in her second appearance, against rivals Norway; in a 2–2 friendly draw at Åråsen Stadion on 5 September 1984. At the 1988 FIFA Women's Invitation Tournament in Guangdong she was part of the Swedish squad who finished runners–up to Norway.

In 1991 Hansson helped Sweden to a third-place finish at the inaugural FIFA Women's World Cup in Guangdong, China. Playing as a sweeper, she featured in four of the team's six matches. In the first game against the United States, Hansson sent a second half penalty kick wide with the Swedes 3–0 down. They ultimately lost the match 3–2.

References

External links
 

Living people
1963 births
Damallsvenskan players
Swedish women's footballers
Sweden women's international footballers
Jitex BK players
FC Rosengård players
Öxabäcks IF players
Women's association football defenders
1991 FIFA Women's World Cup players
UEFA Women's Championship-winning players